Zoë Metcalfe is a British Conservative politician. She was elected to the post of North Yorkshire Police, Fire and Crime Commissioner in November 2021, in a by-election that was called due to the resignation of Philip Allott following his remarks on the murder of Sarah Everard.

Metcalfe is also an elected member of North Yorkshire County Council for the Knaresborough division, and of Harrogate Borough Council for the Claro ward.

She has twice stood as a parliamentary candidate for the Conservative Party, contesting the Doncaster Central constituency in 2015 and Leeds West in 2017.

References 

Living people
Conservative Party (UK) councillors
Conservative Party police and crime commissioners
Councillors in North Yorkshire
Police and crime commissioners in England
Year of birth missing (living people)
21st-century British women politicians